Syed Husain Mohammad Jafri was a Pakistani historian. He served as the chairman of the Pakistan Study Centre, University of Karachi. He died in January 2019. He was the author of The Origins and Early Development of Shi'a Islam.

References

Pakistani scholars
21st-century Muslim scholars of Islam
Shia scholars of Islam
Year of birth missing
Pakistani Shia Muslims
2019 deaths